A lunar module is a lunar lander designed to allow astronauts to travel between a spacecraft in lunar orbit and the lunar surface. As of 2021, the Apollo Lunar Module is the only lunar module to have ever been used in human spaceflight, completing six lunar landings from 1969 to 1972 during the United States' Apollo program.

The LK lunar module was developed by the Soviet Union in the 1960s as a part of several Soviet crewed lunar programs. Several LK modules were flown without crew in low Earth orbit, but the LK lunar module never flew to the Moon, as the development of the N1 Rocket Launch Vehicle required for the lunar flight suffered setbacks (including several launch failures), and after the first crewed Moon landings were achieved by the United States, the Soviet Union cancelled both the N1 Rocket and the LK Lunar Module programs without any further development.

Proposed lunar modules
 Altair (spacecraft), a proposed lunar module for the Constellation program previously known as the Lunar Surface Access Module
 Human Landing System, a class of proposed lunar modules for NASA's Artemis program
 Boeing Lunar Lander, proposed by Boeing
 Lockheed Martin Lunar Lander, proposed by Lockheed Martin
 Starship HLS, proposed by SpaceX
 Luna-Glob, a lunar exploration program by the Russian Federal Space Agency
 XEUS, a lunar module being developed by United Launch Alliance and Masten Space Systems

See also
 List of crewed lunar lander designs
 Moon landing

References

External links
 NASA report on the Apollo 11 Lunar Module

Crewed spacecraft
Exploration of the Moon
Soft landings on the Moon